One Man Up is a 2001 Italian comedy-drama film. It entered the "Cinema del presente" section at the 58th Venice International Film Festival.  It marked the directorial debut of Paolo Sorrentino, who was awarded Nastro d'Argento for Best New Director. The film also won the Ciak d'oro for the script and the Grolla d'oro to actor Toni Servillo.

Plot  
Set during the eighties, the film charts the decline of two men both named Antonio Pisapia who lead entirely separate yet strangely parallel lives. One is a pop singer who finds himself washed up after a sex scandal ends his run of success; the other a football hero whose playing career is abruptly cut short by injury.

Cast 

Toni Servillo - Antonio "Tony" Pisapia
Andrea Renzi - Antonio Pisapia
Nello Mascia - Il Molosso
Ninni Bruschetta - Genny
Angela Goodwin -  Mother of Tony
Roberto De Francesco - Gigi Moscati
Peppe Lanzetta - Salvatore

See also
 List of Italian films of 2001

References

External links

2001 films
2001 comedy-drama films
Films directed by Paolo Sorrentino
Italian association football films
Italian comedy-drama films
2001 directorial debut films
2001 comedy films
2001 drama films
Films set in 1980
Films set in 1984
Films about singers
Films with screenplays by Paolo Sorrentino
2000s Italian films